Boss Beat! is a studio album by Pat Boone, released in 1964 on Dot Records.

Track listing

References 

1964 albums
Pat Boone albums
Dot Records albums